Gaberke (in older sources also Gaberk) is a settlement in the Municipality of Šoštanj in northern Slovenia. The area is part of the traditional region of Styria. The entire municipality is now included in the Savinja Statistical Region.

Name
The name of the settlement was changed from Gabrke to Gaberke in 1988.

Church
The local church is dedicated to Saint Ulrich and belongs to the Parish of Šoštanj. It was built in 1828 on the site of a 16th-century church.

References

External links
Gaberke at Geopedia

Populated places in the Municipality of Šoštanj